The Second Battle of Porto, also known as the Battle of the Douro or the Crossing of the Douro, was a battle in which General Arthur Wellesley's Anglo-Portuguese Army defeated Marshal Soult's French troops on 12 May 1809 and took back the city of Porto.  After taking command of the British troops in Portugal on 22 April, Wellesley (later named 1st Duke of Wellington, Marquess Douro) immediately advanced on Porto and made a surprise crossing of the Douro River, approaching Porto where its defences were weak. Soult's late attempts to muster a defence were in vain. The French quickly abandoned the city in a disorderly retreat.

This battle ended the second French invasion of Portugal. Soult soon found his retreat route to the east blocked and was forced to destroy his guns and burn his baggage train. Wellesley pursued the French army, but Soult's army escaped annihilation by fleeing through the mountains.

Background
The Second Portuguese campaign had started with the Battle of Braga.

French occupation
In the First Battle of Porto (28 March 1809), the French under Marshal Soult defeated the Portuguese under Generals Lima Barreto and Parreiras outside the city of Porto. After winning the battle, Soult stormed the city. In addition to 8,000 military casualties, large numbers of civilians died. 

While Soult was in Porto, a detached force operated to the east under the leadership of Major-General Louis Loison. Initially, this force included General of Division Henri Delaborde's infantry division and Lorge's cavalry division. A Portuguese force under Major General Francisco Silveira captured the French garrison of Chaves and blocked Soult's communications with Spain by blockading the area around Amarante.

From 18 April to 3 May, the Portuguese held Loison on the west bank of the Tâmega River. On the latter day, French engineers succeeded in disarming the explosives-rigged bridge so that Delaborde's infantry could cross it. By May, the French Marshal feared he was outnumbered by the English. Soult stayed up late on 11 May drawing-up his plans for retreat. General of Division Julien Augustin Joseph Mermet's division had already been sent off with the baggage and the artillery park.

Soult retained a total of 10,000 infantry and 1,200 cavalry. Delaborde's division included three battalions each of the 17th Light, 70th Line, and 86th Line Infantry Regiments. General of Division Pierre Hugues Victoire Merle's division was composed of four battalions each of the 2nd and 4th Light Infantry Regiments, and three battalions of the 36th Line Infantry Regiment. General of Division Jean Baptiste Marie Franceschi-Delonne's cavalry was made up of the 1st Hussar Regiment, 8th Dragoon Regiment, and the 22nd and Hanoverian Chasseurs à Cheval Regiments.

Anglo-Portuguese advance
After coming up from Lisbon, the Anglo-Portuguese fought a skirmish with the French at the Battle of Grijó on 11 May. Arriving at the Douro, Wellesley was unable to cross the river because Soult's army had either destroyed or moved all the boats to the northern bank.

According to one historian, 18,400 men at Wellesley's command were organised thus:
 Lieutenant General (LG) William Payne's Cavalry Division
 1st Cavalry Brigade (MG Stapleton-Cotton; 14th LD (minus one sqn), 16th LD, 20th LD (2 sqns) and 3rd King's German Legion (KGL) LD (1 sqn))
 LG Edward Paget's Division (5,145)
 1st KGL Brigade (Brigadier General (BG) Langwerth; 1st and 2nd KGL Line)
 3rd KGL Brigade (BG Dreiburg; 5th and 7th KGL Line)
 6th Brigade (BG R. Stewart; 29th, 1st Bn of Detachments and 1/16th Port. Line)
 LG John Coape Sherbrooke's Division (6,706)
 2nd Guards Brigade (BG Henry Frederick Campbell; 1/Coldstream Gds and 1/3rd Guards)
 4th Brigade (BG Sontag; 97th, 2nd Bn of Detachments and 2/16th Port. Line)
 5th Brigade (BG A. Campbell; 2/7th, 2/53rd and 1/10th Port. Line)
 MG Rowland Hill's Division (4,370)
 1st Brigade (nominally MG Hill, in fact his senior Col.; 1/3rd, 2/48th and 2/66th)
 7th Brigade (BG A. Cameron; 2/9th, 2/83rd and 2/10th Port. Line)

There were four 6-gun artillery batteries (RA: Sillery, Lawson. KGL: Tieling, Heise) under Colonel (Col) Edward Howorth. One had 9-pounders, two had 6-pounders and one had 3-pounders.

Historian Michael Glover stated that the order of battle was somewhat different. Glover lists the following organization.
 1st Guards Brigade: BG Henry F. Campbell, 2,292 (same as 2nd Brigade above)
 2nd Brigade: BG Alexander Campbell, 1,206 (same as 5th Brigade above)
 3rd Brigade: BG John Sontag, 1,307 (same as 4th Brigade above)
 4th Brigade MG Rowland Hill, 2,007 (same as 1st Brigade above)
 5th Brigade: BG Alan Cameron, 1,316 (same as 7th Brigade above)
 6th Brigade: BG Richard Stewart, 1,290 (same as above)
 7th Brigade: MG John Murray, 8th Baronet, 2,913 (same as 1st and 3rd KGL Brigades above, plus detachments of 1st and 2nd KGL Light)
 Cavalry: MG Stapleton Cotton, 1,463 (same as above)
 Artillery: Col Edward Howorth, 24 guns (same as above)

Farther to the east, William Carr Beresford (Marshal of the Portuguese army) led MG Christopher Tilson's British 3rd brigade (1,659 British and ca. 600 Portuguese grenadiers by 6 May morning state) and 5,000 Portuguese to link up with Silveira's force. MG Alex Randoll Mackenzie's British 2nd brigade and a large Portuguese force operated on the line of the Tagus river.

Action
On the morning of 12 May, Colonel John Waters was tasked by Wellesley to find a means of crossing the Douro river, east of Porto. He was approached by a poor local barber who led him to a point on the bank hidden by brush where there was a skiff.  With Colonel Waters, the men crossed the 500-yard wide river, bringing back four unguarded wine barges from the opposite bank, with the assistance of a local prior of the convent and three or four peasants.

When informed of this opportunity, Wellesley told them to "let the men cross."  Immediately, a barge, consisting of 1 junior officer and 24 men from the 3rd Foot crossed the river and occupied a walled seminary overlooking the landing site, followed swiftly by the rest of their company and then the light company of the same battalion. By the time the French realized that Wellesley's forces were on the north bank, the "Buffs" were fortifying their position, with the rest of the battalion of the Buffs of Hill's brigade had crossing in more barges.

Soult, who was asleep at the time, remained unaware of these developments. General of Brigade Maximilien Foy, who was the first to see the British crossing, requisitioned three battalions of the 17th Light Infantry and led an attack on the seminary around 11:30 am. Foy was wounded and his soldiers beaten back with heavy losses. Reinforced later in the day by three more battalions, the French attacked again. By this time, however, three more battalions had occupied the seminary and surrounding buildings, and the French were defeated once again.

Soult withdrew the troops guarding the Porto boats in order to reinforce Foy.

As soon as the French left the riverside, the people of Porto immediately set out in "anything that would float" and ferried more British troops over. Four British battalions crossed immediately and attacked the French from the rear. The French, already planning a leisurely evacuation of the city, instead fled precipitously northeastward.

In order to cut off the French retreat, MG John Murray's 2,900-man brigade with the 14th Light Dragoons had been sent across the Douro at a ferry five miles to the east of Porto. Murray stood aside and failed to block the French escape route, though there was a skirmish. The 14th, however, sped after the retreating French. They charged and succeeded in cutting off about 300 Frenchmen, securing many of them as prisoners. Out of 110 horsemen, 35 were killed in this action.

Results

The British lost 125 men. In the battle for the seminary, Wellesley's second-in-command, Maj-Gen Edward Paget had his arm shattered by a French bullet and it had to be amputated. In addition to 1800 captured the French suffered 600 casualties which included Foy who was wounded.

Soult's retreat
Due to Murray's error of judgement and the bulk of Wellesley's army being on the south side of the Douro, the French escaped on 12 May. However, Loison failed to clear Silveira's force away from Soult's planned path of retreat to the northeast, so Soult was compelled to abandon all his equipment and take footpaths over the hills to the north. Soult's and Loison's forces met at Guimarães, but Wellesley's army marched north.

The British reached Braga (northwest of Guimarães) before the French, forcing Soult to retreat to the northeast again. Meanwhile, Beresford and Silveira were manoeuvring to block Soult's escape route in that direction. After escaping from several tight spots, Soult slipped away over the mountains to Orense in Spain. During the retreat, Soult's corps lost 4,500 men, its military chest and all 58 guns and baggage.

Aftermath
The guerilla war proceeded till the end of the Peninsular war.

The Spanish conventional warfare proceeded 
till the end of the Peninsular war.

Napoleon had ended his invasion of Spain with the occupation of Madrid.

The Second Portuguese campaign had ended with the French retreat out of Portugal.

The Spanish campaign in late 1809 started with the Battle of Talavera with the British army back in Spain.

Notes

References

Further reading

In fiction
The battle of Porto is depicted by Bernard Cornwell in Sharpe's Havoc, Simon Scarrow in Fire and Sword, Allan Mallinson in An Act of Courage, Iain Gale in Keane's Company and by Martin McDowell in the historical novel The Plains of Talavera.

External links
 

Battles involving the United Kingdom
Battles involving France
Battles involving Portugal
Porto 1809
Battles of the Napoleonic Wars
Battle of Porto 2
Battle of Porto 2
King's German Legion
History of Porto
May 1809 events
Arthur Wellesley, 1st Duke of Wellington